Epistemology is the sixth studio album by the Norwegian extreme metal band Keep of Kalessin, released on 16 February 2015 through Indie.

Reception 
The Sonic Seducer remarked the complexity of the album and the "opulent" sound produced by the three band members.

Track listing

Members 

 Arnt "Obsidian C." Grønbech – bass, guitars, vocals, keyboards 
 Robin "Wizziac" Isaksen – bass
 Vegar "Vyl" Larsen – drums
 Attila Csihar – vocals (track 9)
 Jean Michel – artwork 
 Obsidian Claw – producer 
 Stamos Koliousis – mixing, mastering

References 

2015 albums
Keep of Kalessin albums
Nuclear Blast albums
Indie Recordings albums